Bull Lake may refer to:

Glaciers
Bull Lake Glacier

Lakes
In Canada
New Brunswick
Bull Lake (New Brunswick)
Ontario
In Algoma District
Bull Lake (Boon Township, Ontario)
Bull Lake (Varley Township)
Bull Lake (Frontenac County)
In Kenora District
Bull Lake (Sioux Narrows-Nestor Falls)
Bull Lake (Fox Creek)
In Sudbury District
Bull Lake (Sheppard Township)
Bull Lake (Turner Township, Ontario)
Bull Lake (Thunder Bay District)

See also Little Bull Lake (Algoma District); Little Bull Lake (Sudbury District).
N.B. Source for Ontario Lakes: Search on Atlas of Canada on 2009-12-26
In the United States
Wyoming
within the Wind River Indian Reservation
Bull Lake (Wyoming)

Settlements
Bull Lake, New Brunswick, Canada
Bull Lake, Montana, United States

See also
Bull Lake glaciation